HMS Sepoy was an  destroyer, which served with the Royal Navy during the First World War and the Russian Civil War. Sepoy was launched in 1918 and initially joined the Grand Fleet. After the Armistice that ended the First World War,  the ship was briefly transferred to the Reserve Fleet before sailing to Tallinn in 1919 as part of the Royal Navy response to the fighting there. Sepoy rejoined the Reserve Fleet at the end of the year. In 1922, the destroyer served in the Mediterranean Sea. The ship was later allocated to the naval base in Hong Kong, arriving in 1929. During exercises the following year, a depth charge explosion killed six sailors. The destroyer was also damaged. Following the signing of the London Naval Treaty a few days later, Sepoy returned to the United Kingdom and, in 1932, was sold to be broken up at Newport, Wales.

Design and development

Sepoy was one of twenty-four Admiralty  destroyers ordered by the British Admiralty on 7 April 1917 as part of the Eleventh War Construction Programme. Differences with the R class were minor, such as having the searchlight moved aft.

Two funnels were fitted.

Armament consisted of three QF  Mk IV guns on the ship's centreline.  One was mounted raised on the forecastle, one on a platform between the funnels and one aft. The ship also mounted a single  2-pounder "pom-pom" anti-aircraft gun for air defence. Four  torpedo tubes were fitted in two twin rotating mounts aft. The ship was designed to mount two additional  torpedo tubes either side of the superstructure but this required the forecastle plating to be cut away, making the vessel very wet, so they were removed. The weight saved enabled the heavier Mark V 21-inch torpedo to be carried. The ship had a complement of 90 officers and ratings.

Construction and career
Laid down on 6 August 1917 by William Denny and Brothers in Dumbarton with the yard number 1099, Sepoy was launched on 22 May the following year. The vessel was the second with the name, given in honour of the Indian infantry, to serve in the Royal Navy. Sepoy was completed on 6 August and joined the Twelfth Destroyer Flotilla of the Grand Fleet.

After the Armistice that ended the First World War, Sepoy was transferred to the Reserve Fleet at Rosyth. However, the escalating civil war in Russia meant that the destroyer was soon back in service. The United Kingdom felt that the Russians were planning to liberate the Baltic States by integrating them into the new Soviet Union. The destroyer formed part of a flotilla under the command of Rear Admiral Sir Walter Cowan, who had returned to Copenhagen with fresh crews after 19 February 1919. Cowan took Sepoy, along with sister ship  and light cruiser , to Tallinn. The ship remained there until 25 April, when reinforcements arrived. On 3 December, Sepoy was recommissioned in the Reserve Fleet at Chatham, joining the Sixth Destroyer Flotilla of the Mediterranean Fleet. In May 1920, Sepoy was on station at İzmit on the Sea of Marmara, as the Turkish War of Independence continued.

On 2 December 1922, Sepoy was based in Gibraltar but 10 days later departed Malta for Constantinople with sister ship . The vessel returned on 23 February.

On 7 January 1927, Sepoy was recommissioned at Nore to join the Eighth Destroyer Flotilla at the Royal Naval base Tamar at Hong Kong. The vessel arrived on 1 October 1929. On 8 April the following year, the destroyer departed for exercises but, on the following day, one of the depth charges carried aft exploded. Three sailors died instantly and another two were lost overboard. The destroyer was damaged but reached the shore safely. Another sailer later died in hospital.

Thirteen days later, the London Naval Treaty was signed, which limited total destroyer tonnage in the Royal Navy. The Admiralty was looking to introduce more modern destroyers and so needed to scrap some of the older vessels. Sepoy was one of those chosen for retirement. The ship returned to the United Kingdom and, on 2 July 1932, was sold to Cashmore to be broken up at Newport, Wales.

Pennant numbers

References

Citations

Bibliography

 
 
 
 
 
 
 
 
 
 
 

1918 ships
S-class destroyers (1917) of the Royal Navy
Ships built on the River Clyde
World War I destroyers of the United Kingdom